For the People is an American legal drama series that aired on Lifetime from July 21, 2002 until February 16, 2003.

Premise
A liberal Los Angeles assistant district attorney gets a new conservative boss.

Cast
Lea Thompson as Camille Paris
Debbi Morgan as Lora Gibson
Cecilia Suárez as Anita Lopez
A Martinez as Michael Olivas
Michael Reilly Burke as Will Campbell
Anne Dudek as Jennifer Carter
Kimiko Gelman as Judith
Derek Morgan as Thomas Gibson
Wendy Gazelle as Erica
Matthew Richards as Zach

Episodes

References

External links

2002 American television series debuts
2003 American television series endings
2000s American drama television series
2000s　American legal television series
English-language television shows
Lifetime (TV network) original programming
Television shows set in Los Angeles
Television series about prosecutors